Mohamed Nazeeh (born 15 June 1975) is a Maldivian football coach, and former player. He is currently coach of United Victory.

International goals

References

External links 
 
 
 

1975 births
Living people
Maldivian footballers
Maldives international footballers
Victory Sports Club players
New Radiant S.C. players

Association football midfielders